Wang Zhouyu (born 13 May 1994) is a Chinese weightlifter. She won the gold medal in the women's 87 kg event at the 2020 Summer Olympics in Tokyo, Japan.

She participated at the 2018 World Weightlifting Championships, winning the title.

Major results

References

External links
 

1994 births
Living people
Chinese female weightlifters
World Weightlifting Championships medalists
Weightlifters at the 2020 Summer Olympics
Medalists at the 2020 Summer Olympics
Olympic gold medalists for China
Olympic medalists in weightlifting
Olympic weightlifters of China
21st-century Chinese women